Founded in 1933, the National Muzzle Loading Rifle Association (NMLRA) is the largest association of muzzleloaders in the United States.  It is known for its promotion of the sport of muzzleloading which involves the firing of muzzleloader or black-powder firearms.

Membership

There are varying degrees of membership within the NMLRA, all of which entail paying dues to the Association.  Members of the Association are granted all of the rights of a member of the Association.  They also receive a copy of the NMLRA's monthly publication Muzzle Blasts.

Chartered clubs

The NMLRA has granted charters to local and regional muzzleloading gun clubs, groups, or associations in all fifty states in the United States as well as Canada.  Generally, each of the charter clubs holds their own championship shoot and reports the results of the shoot to the NMLRA.  For a complete listing of all clubs, groups, and associations chartered by the NMLRA follow this link: NMLRA Chartered Clubs.

Friendship, Indiana

The NMLRA is based in Friendship, Indiana, approximately forty miles from Cincinnati, Ohio.  The area is a combination of both modern and primitive facilities reflecting the diverse nature of the Association and the sport of muzzleloading.

On site at Friendship, the NMLRA has The Museum of the National Muzzle Loading Rifle Association as well as Gunmakers Hall, where the works of contemporary gunmakers are displayed.  The Museum is located within the historic structure known as The John Linsey Rand House.  The Rand House also houses the offices for "Muzzle Blasts", the NMLRA's monthly publication.  

There are two shooting ranges at Friendship: the Curly Gostomski Primitive Range and the Walter Cline Modern Range.  During national shoots, and other events, the site also hosts Commercial Row where some of today's most skilled muzzleloading craftsmen set up to sell their wares covering all aspects of muzzleloading.  

The site also includes two camping area: a modern area for campers and modern tents and a primitive area for canvas tents, tipis, etc.  No pets or animals are allowed on site for the national shoots or any other NMLRA-sponsored event.

National shoots

The NMLRA holds two national shooting competitions at the Walter Cline Range at Friendship: the annual Spring National Shoot held in mid-June and the National Championship Shoot held in mid-September.  Registration for these events is $30.00 ($20.00 for pre-registration) for members of the NMLRA.

According to the NMLRA website, "During the two major events shooters from around the world compete for national record scores. There are competitions for muzzleloading rifle, pistol, shotgun, musket, bench and slug guns, as well as tomahawk and knife throwing."

Several weekend shoots are also held at Friendship throughout the year including a 4-H Invitational Championship Shoot, the NRA National Muzzleloading Championship Shoot, a Youth Shoot, a Family Shoot, the Lore of the Laughery Shoot, a Turkey Shoot, and a National Women's Weekend Shoot.

National rendezvous

The NMLRA was responsible for creating a number of National Regional Primitive Rendezvous, or historical reenactments of the North American fur trade, during the late 1970s and early-to-mid-1980s.  These rendezvous spanned the entire breadth of the continental United States.  These rendezvous were managed directly by the Association through the year 1998.

However, in late 1998 the NMLRA decided to discontinue their direct control of these national rendezvous as they no longer believed them to be profitable.  They created the National Rendezvous and Living History Foundation to manage the rendezvous.  While the NMLRA technically still continues to sponsor the national rendezvous, the NRLHF currently runs and manages those events that remained affiliated with the Association after its 1998 decision.  Those rendezvous are the Eastern Regional Rendezvous, the Northeastern Regional Rendezvous, the Southeastern Regional Rendezvous, the Old Northwest Territory Regional Rendezvous, and the Midwest Regional Rendezvous.

Other activities and programs

The NMLRA also sponsors an activity known as The Longhunter.  The Longhunter program is designed to encourage the sport of muzzleloading while hunting large game due to the challenges and thrills such activity entails.  It is associated with the Big Game Records Program which is the only trophy recognition program strictly for the muzzleloading hunter.

The NMLRA also sponsors Muzzle Blasts Postal Match.  A target is included in an issue of the NMLRA monthly publication "Muzzle Blasts" and the participant must shoot the target and mail it into the NMLRA along with a $2.00 entry fee.  The winners are posted on the NMLRA website and the proceeds go towards the Association's Youth Program.

The NMLRA is currently seeking to restore the Rand House, a historic structure located on the ground at Friendship and home to both the NMLRA Museum and "Muzzle Blasts".  In order to raise money for this restoration the Association is selling bricks to individuals so that they can inscribe any message of their choice on them for between $50.00 to $250.00.  These bricks will then be used in the restoration of Rand House.

The NMLRA also has a college scholarship program.  They offer two, $500.00 scholarships per-semester to members or dependents of members in good-standing with the NMLRA.  The awarding of the scholarships is based on a number of factors including academic performance in high school as well as the financial need of the applicant.

The NMLRA is also seeking to create a permanent, $1,000,000 endowment for itself by seeking out one thousand individuals who are willing to donate $1,000 each to the Association.  According to the NMLRA website, "The donation will be placed in the permanently restricted endowment fund of the NMLRA. The principal will remain in the endowment, and can be used only to generate interest or to purchase a permanent asset such as land. The principal can never be used for the general operation of the Association. The interest earned produces income for new and innovative programs that help ensure the long-term viability of the organization and help it to prosper."

Education and training

The NMLRA also seeks to educate and train individuals in the sport of muzzleloading so as to further their goals as an organization and to have trained individuals available to manage their activities.  The three main courses the Association offers are as follows:

 The Basic Course is an eight- to ten-hour hands-on, live-fire, course involving muzzleloading rifle, handgun, and shotgun, firearms history, familiarization and maintenance of equipment, proper procedures, and the sportsman's role in society. A score of 80% is required to successfully complete the course
 The Muzzleloading Instructor Course is a hands-on, live-fire muzzleloading rifle, handgun (including revolver), and shotgun course to train instructors for the Basic Course. NMLRA membership is not required. Course participants must be of age to be in 9th grade in high school or older.
 The Trainer Course is a six-hour, in-depth course teaching techniques. Dedicated Instructors in the rifle, handgun, and shotgun disciplines are invited to apply for the trainer course.

See also

 National Rendezvous and Living History Foundation
 Statue of Hope - Wilson Memorial (original NMLRA headquarters landowner), Friendship, Indiana

References
 National Muzzle Loading Rifle Association website

External links
 Muzzle Blasts website

1933 establishments in the United States
Sports organizations of the United States
Muzzleloading
Museums in Ripley County, Indiana
Military and war museums in Indiana
Organizations established in 1933
Shooting sports organizations
Sports museums in Indiana